The 11th Hour Remnant Messenger was an antisemitic Christian identity group founded in Sandpoint, Idaho, by wealthy retired entrepreneurs Vincent Bertollini and Carl E. Story. They were located close to the Aryan Nations compound and cooperated with Aryan Nations members. Bertollini and Story chose Sandpoint because about 98% of the area's residents were non-Jewish whites.

Members of the group believed that non-Jewish white Europeans are the Israelites (the chosen people) described in the Bible, while people who are ethnically Jewish are descendants of Eve and Satan. They believed that non-whites are soulless. They printed large, elaborate, expensive posters depicting their tree of heredity for major ethnic groups and mailed it to many people living in the area.

References

Christian Identity
Antisemitism in Idaho
White supremacist groups in the United States